"Got Your Money" is a single by American rapper Ol' Dirty Bastard in his final appearance, from his second studio album, Nigga Please. The song's chorus is sung by American R&B singer Kelis, who makes her first appearance on record. Both the single and the album were released on Elektra Records in 1999. The song was produced by the Neptunes. It was also the only single released from Nigga Please. The song is listed at number 255 on NMEs "500 Greatest songs of All Time", published in 2014.

Music video
The music video for "Got Your Money" uses footage from the 1975 blaxploitation film Dolemite. No new footage of ODB was filmed for the video. Footage of ODB was taken from the 1995 music video for "Shimmy Shimmy Ya". It also features Kelis, with Beverly Peele and Tangi Miller as backup dancers. Pitchfork Media included the video on its list of the "Top 50 Music Videos of the 1990s".

Track listings

US maxi-CD single
 "Got Your Money" 
 "Got Your Money" 
 "Got Your Money" 
 "I Can't Wait" 
 "I Can't Wait" 
 "I Can't Wait" 
 "Cold Blooded" 

UK cassette single
 "Got Your Money"  – 4:03
 "Got Your Money"  – 5:20

UK CD single
 "Got Your Money"  – 4:03
 "Got Your Money"  – 5:20
 "Got Your Money"  – 5:20
 "Got Your Money" 

German CD single
 "Got Your Money"  – 4:03
 "Got Your Money"  – 4:03
 "Rollin' wit You"  – 3:56

Charts

Certifications

Release history

Other versions
In 2012, a parody of the song was made by ADHD called "Where You Hide Your Money" with 2012 Republican presidential nominee Mitt Romney as the subject of the song. 

Altered versions of the song appeared in 2013 television advertisements for Boost Mobile and a 2015 trailer for the film Get Hard. The song has also been sampled by The Chemical Brothers in their song "Galaxy Bounce".

Another parody of the song is currently featured in the 2020-2021 television commercial, "Got Your Laundry", for the LG WashTower.

References

1999 debut singles
1999 songs
Elektra Records singles
Kelis songs
Music videos directed by Hype Williams
Ol' Dirty Bastard songs
Song recordings produced by the Neptunes
Songs written by Chad Hugo
Songs written by Ol' Dirty Bastard
Songs written by Pharrell Williams